Farahzad is a neighborhood in North West Tehran, the capital city of Iran. It is one of the oldest villages of Tehran. The village is over 1500 years old.

References 

Neighbourhoods in Tehran